Todor Semov (born 20 January 1898, date of death unknown) was a Bulgarian equestrian. He competed at the 1928 Summer Olympics and the 1936 Summer Olympics.

References

1898 births
Year of death missing
Bulgarian male equestrians
Olympic equestrians of Bulgaria
Equestrians at the 1928 Summer Olympics
Equestrians at the 1936 Summer Olympics
Place of birth missing
20th-century Bulgarian people